Shemara may refer to:

 MY Shemara, a 1938-built motor yacht
 Shemara Refit, a shipbuilding company on the Isle of Wight, United Kingdom
 Shemara Tower, one of the towers on Marina Promenade, Dubai
 Shemara Wikramanayake (born 1962), Australian executive